Radoslav Vasilev (born 12 October 1990) is a Bulgarian former professional footballer.

Vasilev began his career as a youth player for Slavia Sofia. In 2007, he moved to England, joining Reading. Vasilev spent two and a half years in the club's academy, but did not make any appearances for the first team. After leaving Reading at the end of the 2009–10 season, he re-joined Slavia. He spent six season with the club, but left in 2016 following a long absence due to injury. Vasilev signed for Septemvri Sofia in December 2016, then joined newly promoted Cypriot First Division club Alki Oroklini in June 2017, before joining Cherno More Varna in February 2018.

On 8 June 2015, Vasilev made his senior international debut for Bulgaria in a 4–0 friendly loss against Turkey.

Career

Early career
Vasilev began his career with Slavia Sofia, where he played until he was 17.

On 12 December 2007, Vasilev joined Reading for an undisclosed fee, after a successful trial period with the club. Reading's Academy Recruitment officer, Steve Shorey (father of Nicky Shorey) explained his reasons for signing Vasilev: "He's different from what we've got at the same age.  He's not just about brawn and pace, he's got football intelligence.  He's a lovely size, around 6 ft 2 in, can use both feet."

Vasilev was released from Reading at the beginning of May 2010, alongside midfielders Mitchell Bryant and Oliver Bozanic.

Slavia Sofia
In July 2010, Vasilev returned to Bulgaria, signing a contract with his home club Slavia Sofia. He made his A Group debut during the 2010–11 season on August 21, 2010, in a 2–0 away win against Pirin Blagoevgrad.

Following a long absence due to injury, he left Slavia on 25 October 2016.

Septemvri Sofia
On 12 December 2016 Vasilev signed with Septemvri Sofia. After almost 2 years without playing he returned in play by debuting for Septemvri in the Vtora Liga on 27 February 2017 in a match against Pomorie won by Septemvri. He scored his first goal for the team on 1 April 2017 for the 5:0  win over Botev Galabovo. On 21 May 2017 he scored 2 goals for the team coming as a substitute in the match against Levski Karlovo.

Alki Oroklini
In June 2017, Vasilev joined Cypriot First Division club Alki Oroklini. On 19 August, he made his club debut in a 1–0 away victory over Ethnikos Achna in their first league game of the season. On 25 October 2017, he scored his first goal in a 3–2 defeat by Ermis Aradippou.

Cherno More
On 5 February 2018, Vasilev signed with Cherno More.  On 17 February 2018, he made his debut for the club scoring the opener in a 1–4 home defeat by Beroe.

Arda Kardzhali
Vasilev joined Arda Kardzhali in June 2019.

Vasilev retired in the end of 2021 after long treated knee injury.

International
In March 2015, Vasilev was called up to the Bulgarian national side for a Euro 2016 qualifier against Italy, but did not debut. He earned his first cap on 8 June 2015, after coming on as a substitute for Iliyan Mitsanski during the second half of the 0–4 loss against Turkey. He scored his first international goal on 9 September 2018, after coming on as a substitute against Norway in the UEFA Nations League.

International goals
Scores and results list Bulgaria's goal tally first.

Career statistics

Club

References

External links

Player Profile at National-Football-Teams

1990 births
Living people
Footballers from Sofia
Bulgarian footballers
Bulgaria youth international footballers
Bulgaria under-21 international footballers
Bulgaria international footballers
Association football forwards
Reading F.C. players
PFC Slavia Sofia players
FC Lyubimets players
FC Septemvri Sofia players
Alki Oroklini players
PFC Cherno More Varna players
FC Arda Kardzhali players
Xanthi F.C. players
First Professional Football League (Bulgaria) players
Second Professional Football League (Bulgaria) players
Cypriot First Division players
Bulgarian expatriates in England
Bulgarian expatriate sportspeople in Cyprus
Bulgarian expatriate sportspeople in Greece
Expatriate footballers in England
Expatriate footballers in Cyprus
Expatriate footballers in Greece